Daytona USA 2: Battle on the Edge (known simply as  in Japan) is an arcade racing game released by Sega in 1998 as a follow-up to the extremely successful Daytona USA. The game featured vastly superior graphics, utilizing the Sega Model 3 hardware. The majority of Daytona USA 2 cabinets were released as deluxe models (with far fewer Twin Cabinets), which could be linked together for up to sixteen players. A notable change from the original is the ability to select a car and corresponding driver, each with varying capabilities for varying levels of player experience. The 'time lap' mode also returns, and is accessed in the same manner – by holding down start at the transmission select screen. Like the original game, mirrored versions of the tracks can also be played by holding down the Start button when selecting the course. It is recommended, however, that the player has had mastery of the course beforehand. By request, an arcade operator could put the game on Grand Prix or Endurance mode to increase the number of laps in a game. Finishing a race in the top 3 in any course allows the player to view an "ending" and see the game credits.

An addition to the game was the "slingshot", corresponding to advanced NASCAR drafting techniques. There are no direct home ports of Battle on the Edge and Power Edition. Originally, Daytona USA 2 was planned to be released on Sega's Dreamcast system according to contemporary game magazines, but the project was quietly cancelled and a special version of the original game, titled Daytona USA 2001, took its place as a home console entry for the platform.

Power Edition
In late 1998, a few months after the release of Battle on the Edge, Sega released an updated version, known as Daytona USA 2: Power Edition. Changes in this game include the environment of the beginner course; the dome and natural scenery that encircle the track in the regular release are removed, resulting in a "NASCAR Oval" look, though the course layout remains the same. Also included is the "Challenge" course option, which combines the three courses altogether. Along with slightly revamped handling physics, the beginner car's livery is redesigned. Added to Power Edition is the Hornet Classic car, the player car from Daytona USA with an altered design. The Hornet Classic was actually usable in Battle on the Edge, but the code to unlock it was unknown until December 31, 2020.

The opponent cars' AI is also more aggressive in this version, and a change is made to one corner in the advanced course to balance out the difficulty. Before this change, many players considered this particular corner the most difficult in the game. Unusual for an arcade game, there was also an official strategy guide released in Japan. This strategy guide featured developer interviews as well as comprehensive tips and hints compiled by a group of arcade driving game professionals known as Team Marubaku. The strategy guide has been out of print for a number of years and second-hand copies can command high prices.

Soundtrack
The Daytona USA 2 soundtrack was composed by Fumio Ito and Takenobu Mitsuyoshi, the latter being the composer of and singer on Daytona USA. Compared to the original game's soundtrack, the Daytona USA 2 soundtrack is heavier and more electric. Dennis St. James was the vocalist for all tracks with lyrics, four total. The game also has an alternate soundtrack with vocals provided by Mitsuyoshi, which can be enabled by the arcade operator. Contrary to popular belief, the band Winger did not create an entirely new soundtrack for the game or perform it as a band. Instead, the guitarist and drummer for Winger, Reb Beach and Rod Morgenstein, lent their skills to contribute to the soundtrack.

Daytona USA 2s soundtrack was released in Japan on dual-disc album on July 17, 1998. The first disc contains 'original audio' tracks – that is, the course themes etc. in standard format – and 'original sound' tracks – where Tom West, commentator for the Sega Sports Channel, reports on the day's racing. These tracks are the previous course themes mixed in parts with in-game audio, such as engine noise, crashes, radio chatter from the pit crew, and so on.

Reception
In Japan, Game Machine listed Daytona USA 2 on their August 1, 1998 issue as being the third most-successful dedicated arcade game of the month. Next Generation reviewed the arcade version of the game, rating it four stars out of five, and stated that "we're happy to report that it comes completed with impressive graphics, improvements, new tracks, a level of detail that brings new sophistication to the game, and up to sixteen-player heats".

See also
 NASCAR Arcade
 Sega Rally 2
 Scud Race

References

1998 video games
Amusement Vision games
Arcade video games
Arcade-only video games
Racing video games
Sega arcade games
Video games developed in Japan
Video games scored by Takenobu Mitsuyoshi
Cancelled Dreamcast games
Daytona USA